Nikki Fuller (born January 23, 1968) is an American professional female bodybuilder.

Early life
Born Nikki Garner in Dayton, Ohio, she moved with her family to Gresham, Oregon, when she was 10 years old. She developed an interest in athletics while a student at Gresham High School. Fuller competed in track and field and, as a freshman in 1983, helped her team go undefeated and take 1st in the water polo state championship.

Post-graduation, Fuller set her focus on bodybuilding, having realized her own potential through sports. When she started training at a local gym, Fuller weighed  but soon added  of muscle.

Personal life
According to posts on her personal Instagram profile, Fuller is a conservative and ardent supporter of former President Donald Trump. She is also a professing Christian.

Career

Bodybuilding
She made her competitive debut at the 1988 Novice Oregon and won 1st place. Fuller then set her sights on bigger stages and took third place at the 1988 Emerald Cup, a contest she would come back to win the following year. Fuller turned pro after winning the heavyweight and overall titles at the 1990 National Physique Committee Nationals.

In 1988 and 1989, Fuller took first in the Henry Weinhard's Handcar Races in Sacramento, San Francisco and Portland, Oregon, as well as Labatt's in British Columbia. She was subsequently sponsored by Henry Weinhard's. Her professional career included a 1st-place finish at the 1992 Jan Tana Classic and Top 10 finishes at the Ms. Olympia and Ms. International contests.

In 1993, Fuller was featured on the cover of The Women, a photography book of top female bodybuilders compiled by Bill Dobbins.

Stats
Measurements   
Height: 5'9" 
Weight: 185 lbs to 195 lbs 
Biceps: 17" (425 mm) 
Chest: 52" 
Waist: 27" 
Hips: 36"

Contest history
1988 Novice Oregon1st
1988 Emerald Cup3rd
1989 Emerald Cup1st
1989 Bill Pearl Classic1st
1989 Pacific Coast1st
1989 Emerald Cup1st
1989 Orange County Classic2nd
1990 NPC USA Championship2nd (HW)
1990 IFBB North American2nd (HW)
1990 IFBB World Amateurs3rd (HW)
1990 NPC Nationals1st (HW & Overall)
1991 Jan Tana Classic8th
1991 Ms. International7th
1992 Jan Tana Classic1st
1992 Ms. Olympia9th
1993 Ms. Olympia14th
1995 Ms. International6th
1996 Jan Tana Classic7th
1997 Ms. International10th

Acting
In 1999, Fuller shifted her attention away from bodybuilding for the first time in eleven years and turned her eyes toward Hollywood. She relocated to Los Angeles and subsequently landed uncredited TV roles in Ally McBeal (as a body double for lead actress Calista Flockhart in Season 5 Episode 12, "The New Day") and Arli$$ (in Season 7 Episode 6, "Moments to Remember" as a background actor in a scene featuring Jim Turner, Jack LaLanne and Tony Gonzalez). She also had a credited appearance in Just Shoot Me! (opposite David Spade as a female boxer in Season 5 Episode 10, "Finch and the Fighter").

Fuller was also seen in a 2001 Right Guard Extreme commercial with Dave Chappelle as one of two female wrestlers.

Wrestling
Fuller was featured on the television show Women of Wrestling (WOW) as Athena; after her contract with WOW ended, she continued wrestling professionally under her own name. From 2001 to 2004 she was with Ultimate Pro Wrestling (UPW), a company that represents World Wrestling Entertainment as a West Coast talent house.

References

External links
 Official Website
 AMG Lite Website for Female Bodybuilders
 

1968 births
Living people
Sportspeople from Gresham, Oregon
American female bodybuilders
Professional bodybuilders
American Christians
American film actresses
American television actresses
American female professional wrestlers
Actresses from Oregon
Actresses from Ohio
Sportspeople from Dayton, Ohio
Gresham High School (Oregon) alumni
21st-century American women